The National Women's Soccer League (NWSL) is the highest-level professional soccer league for women in the United States. The league has 12 teams in its upcoming 2023 season, and every team has one primary home stadium.

, the highest attendance in the league's history occurred on September 17, 2022 when a sellout crowd of 32,000 saw San Diego Wave FC defeat Angel City FC 1–0 in Wave FC's first match at the newly opened Snapdragon Stadium.

Primary stadiums 
These are primary stadiums in the 2023 NWSL season.

Future stadiums

Secondary and former stadiums

Angel City FC
 Titan Stadium (2022 – all Challenge Cup home matches)

Boston Breakers
 Dilboy Stadium (2013 – all home matches)
 Harvard Stadium (2014 – all home matches)
 Jordan Field (2015–2017 – all home matches)

Chicago Red Stars
 Sports Complex at Benedictine University (2013–2015, most home matches. In 2014 and 2015 a total of three regular-season matches and one playoff match were held at Toyota Park, now known as SeatGeek Stadium.)
 Soldier Field (one home match in 2022)

FC Kansas City
 Shawnee Mission District Stadium (2013 – all home matches)
 Durwood Soccer Stadium (2014 – all home matches)
 Swope Soccer Village (2015–2017 – all home matches)

Kansas City Current
 Legends Field (2021 – all home matches except one at Children's Mercy Park)

NJ/NY Gotham FC
 Yurcak Field (as Sky Blue FC: 2013–2019 – all home matches except two 2019 matches at Red Bull Arena)
 MSU Soccer Park (2021 – all Challenge Cup home matches)
 Subaru Park (one home match each in 2021 and 2022)

OL Reign
 Starfire Sports Complex (as Seattle Reign FC: 2013 – all home matches; 2014 – NWSL final)
 Memorial Stadium (as Seattle Reign FC: 2014–2018 – all home matches except 2014 NWSL final)
 Cheney Stadium (as Reign FC: 2019; 2020–2021 – all home matches except one 2021 match at Lumen Field)

Orlando Pride
 Camping World Stadium (2016 – all home matches)

San Diego Wave FC
 Torero Stadium (2022 – first 9 home matches, before opening of Snapdragon Stadium)

Utah Royals FC
 Rio Tinto Stadium (2018–2020 – all home matches). Also hosted semifinals and final of 2020 Challenge Cup.

Washington Spirit
 Maryland SoccerPlex (2013–2020 – all home matches through 2017; primary home in 2018 and 2019; originally scheduled matches in 2020 canceled due to COVID-19)
 Segra Field (2020–2022 – select home matches as one of two primary home stadiums alongside Audi Field)

Western New York Flash
 Rochester Rhinos Stadium (2013–2016 – all home matches)
 Frontier Field (2016 – one match vs. Seattle Reign FC)

2020 NWSL Challenge Cup
 Zions Bank Stadium (2020 — all Challenge Cup matches except semifinals and final)

See also

 National Women's Soccer League attendance
 List of soccer stadiums in the United States

References

Stadiums
 
National Women's Soccer League